Giorgi Mujaridze (born 22 March 1998) is a Georgian athlete specialising in the shot put. He won a gold medal in the event at the 2018 Championships of the Small States of Europe.

His personal bests are 20.27 metres outdoors (Cairo 2016) and 21.21 metres indoors, the latter being a national record.

He competed in the shot put at the 2020 Summer Olympics.

References

1998 births
Living people
Shot putters from Georgia (country)
Olympic athletes of Georgia (country)
Athletes (track and field) at the 2020 Summer Olympics
Athletes (track and field) at the 2014 Summer Youth Olympics